The Royal was a full-sized automobile produced by the Chrysler Corporation in the United States. It was firstly released in 1933 and continued being built until 1934. Then, the model ended production and did not returned until 1937 - continuing until 1950.

Chrysler Eight
For production year 1931, Chrysler introduced their first straight eight engine for the Chrysler Imperial, and offered it in the Chrysler Eight Series CD. It borrowed appearance influences from the Cord L-29. The engine used had a  displacement that was smaller than the one used in the Imperial Series CG, followed in 1932 with the Chrysler Series CP and an upgraded  engine, while both Eights used a  wheelbase. The Chrysler Eight offered sweeping fenders, rear suicide doors, dual windshield wipers, dual taillights and dual chrome trumpet horns, sharing an appearance with the 1931 Chrysler Imperial Series CG, and was available with five different two-door body style choices that could accommodate between two through five passengers, and three four-door coachwork choices were offered, to include a sedan convertible and two versions of the Royal Sedan in Standard and Special trim packages. Prices ranged from US$1,495 ($ in  dollars ) for the two-door Sport Roadster to US$1,970 ($ in  dollars ) for the four-door Dual Cowl Phaeton. A stripped-down Chrysler Eight Series CD Sport Roadster was entered along with an Imperial roadster in the 1931 24 Hours of Le Mans but did not finish due to radiator issues.

Large displacement engines provided the horsepower and torque clients wanted and due to the low quality of gasoline fuel at the time, and low compression ratios, 50 bhp was more than adequate. It is estimated that the rating equivalent of early gasoline available varied from 40 to 60 octane and that the "High-Test", sometimes referred to as "fighting grade", probably averaged 50 to 65 octane.

Chrysler Royal (eight cylinder engine)
The Chrysler Royal is a full-size car that was produced by Chrysler. The "Royal" nameplate was added to the 1932 Chrysler Eight Series CP and appeared in 1933 as the Chrysler Royal Series CT and was previously used to describe a top level trim package on sedans. The Royal was originally installed with the Chrysler Straight Eight, and it was the second Chrysler to use a nameplate that didn't refer to a "Series" designation that referred to a internal body code or the speed it was capable of in past products. The first Chrysler product to do so was the Imperial, which it originally shared a shortened chassis. The Royal was offered as a two-door Business Coupe, Roadster Coupe, Convertible Coupe, a two-door, five-passenger Convertible Sedan and four-door Sedan using a shorter  wheelbase from previous years. The longer  wheelbase was used for the eight-passenger sedan, while the longer wheelbase was available as a cowl and chassis only for special coachwork choices from private companies, of which 95 were documented to have been built. Prices ranged from US$895 ($ in  dollars ) for the business coupe to US$1,085 ($ in  dollars ) for the convertible sedan, while the long wheelbase was listed at US$1,125 ($ in  dollars ), offering the appearance of the flagship Imperial but at an affordable price.

Chrysler Royal (six cylinder engine)
The "Royal" nameplate was used for one year in 1933 when the Airflow replaced the Royal in 1934, then brought back as a new model in 1937 when the Airflow sold poorly, and was sold alongside the Airflow which continued to offer the Chrysler Straight Eight. The Airflow received no direct successor. A November 1936 advertisement listed the 1937 Royal as available in ten body types, starting at US$715 ($ in  dollars ), with the four door sedan at US$815 ($ in  dollars ). The 1937 Royal Series C-16 was installed with the Chrysler Straight Six and took the entry-level position in the Chrysler hierarchy, while being shared with the DeSoto Airstream. In 1939 the Series C-22 Royal introduced the "Royal Windsor" nameplate as a trim package, then in 1941, the "Royal", "Windsor" and "Highlander" became separate nameplates sharing the same wheelbase but only using the Straight Six, with "Windsor" models offering more standard features and a higher standard interior over the "Royal".

The Royal replaced the Chrysler Six that the company originated with in 1925, and the Royal remained the 6-cylinder entry-level model for Chrysler until it was dropped at the end of 1950 model year, making the Chrysler Windsor the entry-level car for the 1951 model year. Pre-war models were offered in two wheelbase lengths, with coupes and sedans available on the shorter wheelbase, while seven-passenger sedan and limousine were offered on the longer wheelbase. While it was the most affordable Chrysler, it was still a well equipped car with luxurious attention to detail as it was above DeSoto Custom, Dodge Custom and Plymouth De Luxe.

The Royal name was revived by Chrysler Australia in 1957 for an Australian produced model based on the 1953 Plymouth. The "royal" model name was also revived for the 1955 North American Dodge Royal.

The name was later applied as a trim level of the Chrysler Newport from 1970 to 1972; It was also used on Dodge Ram pickup trucks and vans until the early 1990s.

See also
 Chrysler Airflow
 Chrysler Imperial

References

Royal
Rear-wheel-drive vehicles
1930s cars
1940s cars
1950s cars
Full-size vehicles
Sedans
Coupés
Convertibles